Baiba Eglīte (born 9 January 1989) is a Latvian basketball player for TTT Rīga and the Latvian national team.

She participated at the 2018 FIBA Women's Basketball World Cup.

University of Texas at El Paso statistics 

Source

References

External links

1989 births
Living people
Guards (basketball)
Latvian expatriate basketball people in the United States
Latvian expatriate basketball people in the Czech Republic
Latvian women's basketball players
Basketball players from Riga
UTEP Miners women's basketball players